Netball in the United States is a sport which has only limited popular support.  The sport is traditionally a female dominated sport.  However, in the United States of America, there are few netball clubs, most play taking place between high school or college sides, almost entirely of females.

History

Netball emerged from early versions of basketball as a sport American females could play, as at the time women worn skirts when playing sports. The sport is popular in Commonwealth countries (stemming from the days of the British Commonwealth) but has never taken hold as a mainstream sport in the United States, where it is mostly popular amongst Caribbean immigrants in the country.

National Board

Netball is run in the United States by two major sports governing boards Netball America and United States of America Netball Association.

National teams

The men's and women's national team have had limited success in international competitions.

References